Rai 5 (pronounced Rai Cinque) is an Italian free-to-air television channel owned and operated by state-owned public broadcaster RAI – Radiotelevisione italiana. It was launched on 26 November 2010 replacing Rai Extra. Its programming deals with culture with a particular attention to the arts world, offering documentaries, reportages and highbrow entertainment (music, dance, cabaret and theatre).

Logos

Eurovision Song Contest
Rai 5 has broadcast from 2011 until 2013 the semifinal of the Eurovision Song Contest where Italy has to vote.

References

External links
 Official website
 

5
Television channels and stations established in 2010
Italian-language television stations